Oxynoemacheilus tongiorgii is a species of stone loach from the genus Oxynoemacheilus. It is found in the Kul River basin in Iran. It has only been recorded once.

The fish is named in honor of Paolo Tongiorgi (b. 1936) of the University of Modena, who as co-editor of the Italian Journal of Zoology, helped in the final editing of the special volume in which this fish's description appeared.

References

tongiorgii
Fish described in 1998
Taxa named by Teodor T. Nalbant
Taxa named by Pier Giorgio Bianco
Endemic fauna of Iran